In physics, force is any interaction that, when unopposed, will change the motion of an object. Physical force may also refer to:
 Physical force Chartism, the section of the Chartist movement in mid-19th century Britain that supported the use of violence
 Physical force Irish republicanism, the section of the Irish republican movement since the 18th century that supports the use of violence

See also
 Monopoly on the legitimate use of physical force, a core concept of modern public law
 Force (disambiguation)